The 2022 Tyrone Senior Football Championship is the 117th edition of Tyrone GAA's premier Gaelic football tournament for senior clubs in County Tyrone, Northern Ireland. The championship consisted of 16 teams and had a straight knock-out format. The winners, Errigal Ciaran, received the O'Neill Cup after their victory over Carrickmore and represent Tyrone in the Ulster Senior Club Football Championship for 2022.  

The draw for the championship was made on 7 June 2022.

Team Changes
The following teams have changed division since the 2021 championship season.

Promoted from IFC

Greencastle (Division 2 Champions)
Moortown (Intermediate Champions)

Relegated from SFC

Eglish (15th in SFL)Galbally (16th in SFL)Pomeroy (17th in SFL)Edendork (18th in SFL)

Participating teams
The following 16 teams took part in the 2022 edition of the Tyrone Senior Football Championship.

Ardboe Ó Donovan Rossa
Omagh St Endas
Dromore St Dympna’s
Killyclogher St Marys
Moy Tír na nÓg
Errigal Ciaran (champions)
Trillick St Macartans
Dungannon Clarkes
Moortown St Malachys
Clonoe Ó Rahillys
Greencastle St Patricks
Donaghmore St Patricks
Carrickmore St Colmcilles (Runners Up)
Coalisland Fianna
Loughmacroy St Teresas
Derrylaughan Kevin Barrys

Round 1

Quarter-finals

Semi-finals

Final

References

Tyrone Senior Football Championship